The Liar is a 1961 West German film directed by Ladislao Vajda. It was shot at the Wandsbek Studios in Hamburg.

Plot summary

Differences from play

Cast

Soundtrack

External links 

1961 films
1961 comedy-drama films
German comedy-drama films
West German films
1960s German-language films
German black-and-white films
German films based on plays
Films shot at Wandsbek Studios
1960s German films